Daniel Adam Rayfield (born March 1, 1979) is an American politician serving as the Speaker of the Oregon House of Representatives representing the 16th district, which includes Corvallis and Philomath.

Early life and education
Rayfield was born in Orange County, California. After moving to Oregon, he attended Tigard High School. Rayfield later graduated from Western Oregon University in 2003 and went on to earn his J.D. degree from Willamette University College of Law.

Career 
While in law school Rayfield worked as a clerk with the Benton County District Attorney's Office, gaining trial experience prosecuting misdemeanors and DUIIs.

After law school Rayfield began his legal career working for the Weatherford Thompson law firm in Albany, Oregon. His practice initially focused on general civil litigation. In 2007, Rayfield served as a plaintiff's attorney in a high-profile case involving a police officer that wrongfully arrested several individuals under false DUII accusations.

Following a successful resolution to the case, Rayfield worked to help pass HB 2318 during the 2009 legislative session of the Oregon Legislative Assembly. HB 2318 allowed people who were falsely accused of driving under the influence to remove the false charge from their record. The bill passed unanimously in the Oregon House and Senate and was signed into law by the governor on June 18, 2009.

In May 2009 Rayfield joined the law firm of Nelson & MacNeil. His practice focused on representing individuals with claims against corporations, and insurance companies. In 2014, Rayfield became a partner with the law firm changing the firm’s name to Nelson MacNeil Rayfield Trial Attorneys PC.

Oregon House of Representatives 

Rayfield was sworn in as a state representative from House District 16 on January 12, 2015.

During the 2015 legislative session, Rayfield served on the House Committee on Rules, the Joint Committee on Ways and Means, as co-chair of the Joint Ways and Means Subcommittee on Natural Resources, and as vice chairman of the House Committee on Consumer Protection and Government Effectiveness. During the session Rayfield acted as a key facilitator, successfully negotiating a bipartisan solution to shore-up a $30 million shortfall with the Oregon Department of Fish and Wildlife budget.

Following the 2015 legislative session, Rayfield was elected by his colleagues to serve as House majority whip. During the interim in 2015 Rayfield was also appointed Co-Chair of the Joint Committee on Ways and Means Subcommittee on Public Safety.

In the 2016 legislative session, Rayfield sponsored several key bills that were eventually signed into law. In particular, he successfully shepherded legislation extending unemployment insurance benefits for up to an additional six months to locked-out workers, which immediately impacted 180 Steelworkers locked-out of the Allegheny Technologies plant in Albany, Oregon.

Rayfield was named a "Rising Star" by the Oregon League of Conservation Voters (OLCV) in its 2015 Environmental Scorecard. He was recognized by OLCV for his work as co-chair of the Ways and Means Subcommittee on Natural Resources, and specifically his efforts to forge compromise to address a $30 million budget shortfall for the Oregon Department of Fish and Wildlife.

In 2015, Rayfield was also chosen by the Council of State Governments West (CSG West), a nonpartisan, nonprofit organization serving state legislators of both parties in 13 Western states, as a participant in its training institute for lawmakers in their first four years of service.

On February 1, 2022 Rayfield was sworn in as the Speaker of the House of the Oregon House Legislature.

Personal life 
Rayfield lives in Corvallis with his wife Amanda and their son. His mother was an activist and small business owner that reveled in dragging her son to events promoting progressive causes throughout his youth. His father, a retired colonel in the Air Force Reserve Command and commercial insurance executive had more conservative views.

In the community, Rayfield has served numerous roles including Commissioner on the Linn-Benton Housing Authority, member of the New Roots Housing Board, Past-President of the Linn-Benton Bar Association, past chair of the Linn and Benton Judicial Screening Committee, past president of the Majestic Theater Management Board, former Linn County Peer Court Judge, and former coach of the Oregon State University Mock Trial Team.

External links
 Campaign website
 Legislative website

References

1979 births
21st-century American politicians
Living people
Politicians from Tigard, Oregon
Politicians from Corvallis, Oregon
Oregon lawyers
People from Orange County, California
Speakers of the Oregon House of Representatives
Democratic Party members of the Oregon House of Representatives
Western Oregon University alumni
Willamette University College of Law alumni